Jonathan Neil Morgan (born 20 May 1979) is a Welsh male badminton player.

Achievements

BWF International Challenge/Series
Men's doubles

 BWF International Challenge tournament
 BWF International Series tournament
 BWF Future Series tournament

References

External links
 

1979 births
Living people
People from Gorseinon
Welsh male badminton players
Commonwealth Games competitors for Wales
Badminton players at the 2014 Commonwealth Games
Badminton players at the 2010 Commonwealth Games
Badminton players at the 2006 Commonwealth Games
Sportspeople from Swansea